Sax Expressions is an  album by saxophonist Sonny Stitt recorded in 1965 and originally released on the Roost label.

Track listing 
All compositions by Sarah Boatner except as indicated
 "Round Robin" - 6:28 
 "How Do You Do" - 6:32 
 "Mother Tucker" - 4:31 
 "For All We Know" (Sam M. Lewis, J. Fred Coots) - 2:21 
 "Don't Worry" - 4:33 
 "Cut It Off" - 5:00 
 "I Know That You Know" (Vincent Youmans, Anne Caldwell, Otto Harbach) - 3:31

Personnel 
Sonny Stitt - alto saxophone
Harold Mabern - piano
Ben Tucker - bass
Roy Haynes - drums

References 

1965 albums
Albums produced by Teddy Reig
Roost Records albums
Sonny Stitt albums